The men's 90 kilograms event at the 2002 Asian Games was held on October 3 and October 5, 2002 at the Busan Citizens' Hall in Busan, South Korea.

Schedule
All times are Korea Standard Time (UTC+09:00)

Results

Preliminary round

Final round

References

Preliminary Round
Final Round

Men's 90 kg